The 2007 Slave Lake municipal election was held Monday, October 15, 2007. Since 1968, provincial legislation has required every municipality to hold triennial elections. The citizens of Slave Lake, Alberta, elected one mayor and six councillors (all at large), and participated in electing two of the High Prairie School Division No. 48's eight trustees (as Ward 4). The voters were also asked a series of plebiscite questions. Of the eligible voters, only 1,261 turned in a ballot, an average of 4.5 councillors per ballot.

Results
Bold indicates elected, and incumbents are italicized.

Mayor

Councillors

Public School Trustees

Trustee Monica Edwards (née Smears) married in January 2008.

Questions

References

Slave Lake